Ranolus is a genus of beetles in the family Dermestidae from Southeast Asia and Oceania. It was originally described as a subgenus of Attagenus, containing only the species Ranolus cavernicola. It was later found to be a separate genus, and was placed in its own tribe, Ranolini, along with Orphilodes. A second species, Ranolus tenebricola, was described by Jiří Háva in 2014. Orphilodes was later synonymized with Ranolus.

Species
Ranolus contains the following seven species:
 Ranolus australis (Lawrence & Ślipiński, 2005) — Australia
 Ranolus caledonicus Háva, 2017 — New Caledonia
 Ranolus cavernicola (Blair, 1929) — Malaysia
 Ranolus malleecola (Lawrence & Ślipiński, 2005) — Australia
 Ranolus minor (Lawrence & Ślipiński, 2005) — Australia
 Ranolus papuanus (Háva, 2015) — Papua New Guinea
 Ranolus tenebricola Háva, 2014 — Thailand

References

Dermestidae
Dermestidae genera